Ibrahima "Ibra" Barry Pérez (born 1 May 2002) is a Spanish footballer who plays as a midfielder for CD Tenerife.

Club career
Born in Santa Cruz de Tenerife, Canary Islands to a Spanish mother and a Guinean father, Barry was a CD Tenerife youth graduate. In April 2021, while still a youth, he suffered a serious knee injury, being sidelined for more than a year.

In 2021, Barry started to feature as a senior with the C-team in the regional leagues, later playing for the reserves in Tercera Federación and then renewing his contract. He made his first team debut on 3 September 2022, coming on as a second-half substitute for Carlos Ruiz in a 1–0 Segunda División home win over Racing de Santander.

References

External links
Tenerife profile 

2002 births
Living people
Footballers from Santa Cruz de Tenerife
Spanish footballers
Association football midfielders
CD Tenerife B players
CD Tenerife players
Tercera División players
Tercera Federación players
Segunda División players
Spanish people of Guinean descent
Spanish sportspeople of African descent